Unity Presbyterian Church Complex is a historic church in Fort Mill, South Carolina.

It was built in 1881 and added to the National Register of Historic Places in 1992.

References

Presbyterian churches in South Carolina
Churches on the National Register of Historic Places in South Carolina
Colonial Revival architecture in South Carolina
Churches completed in 1882
19th-century Presbyterian church buildings in the United States
National Register of Historic Places in York County, South Carolina
Fort Mill, South Carolina
Churches in York County, South Carolina